Will Hicok Low (March 31, 1853November 27, 1932) or Will Hicock Low was an American artist, muralist, and writer on art.

Biography
He was born at Albany, New York. In 1873 he entered the atelier of Jean-Léon Gérôme in the École des Beaux Arts at Paris, subsequently joining the classes of Carolus-Duran, with whom he remained until 1877. Returning to New York, he became a member of the Society of American Artists in 1878 and of the National Academy of Design in 1890. His pictures of New England types, and illustrations of John Keats, brought him into prominence.

He married Berthe Julienne in France in 1878.

Subsequently, he turned his attention to decoration, and executed panels and medallions for the Waldorf-Astoria Hotel in New York City, a panel for the Essex County Court House in Newark, New Jersey as well as numerous panels for private residences and stained glass windows for various churches, including St. Paul's Methodist Episcopal Church, Newark.

He was an instructor in the schools of Cooper Union, New York, during 1882 to 1885, and in the school of the National Academy of Design from 1889 to 1892. Low, who is known to a wider circle as the friend of R. L. Stevenson, published some reminiscences, A Chronicle of Friendships, 1873-1900 (1908).

In 1909 he illustrated the book "In Arcady" by Hamilton Wright Mabie.  The style was influenced by the Art Nouveau movement.

After the death of Berthe, in 1909 he married the former Mary Fairchild, the former wife of sculptor Frederick William MacMonnies.

He painted a series of murals in the New York State Education Department rotunda in Albany, New York.  Using figures and symbols from Roman and Greek mythology paired with New York buildings and landscapes, the artist charts major milestones in human progress—in terms of art, science, technology, modernization, liberty, democracy, and quality of life. The earliest panels, such as Architecture, Astronomy & Geography, and Medicine & Chemistry, combine theory and practical skills. Another eight, including Theseus, the Pathfinder, feature modern inventions to show how far humankind had progressed by the early 20th century. The final paintings reflect a patriotic theme, with subjects such as The Standard, The United States Military Academy, and the Shaft of Union. Taken together, these paintings—originally gracing the entrances of the State Library Main Reading Room, the Law Library, and the Periodicals Library—complement the Rotunda's architectural nobility and its aura of intellectual enlightenment.

Another mural by him is located in the Howard M. Metzenbaum U.S. Courthouse.

Notes

External links

 UNCG American Publishers' Trade Bindings: Will Hicok Low
 Biography at Morseburg Galleries

1853 births
1933 deaths
American muralists
19th-century American painters
American male painters
20th-century American painters
National Academy of Design members
National Academy of Design faculty
Artists from Albany, New York
American portrait painters
Art Nouveau illustrators
American illustrators
19th-century American male artists
20th-century American male artists
Members of the American Academy of Arts and Letters